The Chinese Ambassador to Iran is the official representative of the People's Republic of China to the Islamic Republic of Iran.

List of representatives

References 

 
Iran
China